Arlete Sales Lopes, more known as Arlette Salles (born Paudalho, 17 June 1942) is a Brazilian actress.

Biography 
Born in the interior of Pernambuco, she was married between 1958 and 1970 to the actor Lucio Mauro, with whom she has two children: Alexander Barbalho (actor) and Gilberto Salles (filmmaker). Her grandchildren are actor Pedro Medina and Joan. She divorced Lucio Mauro and at the end of the 1970s, and was married to actor Tony Tornado. 
Arlete Salles was the joint winner of the São Paulo Association of Art Critics Award for Best Actress in 1996. After battling cancer, she returned to TV in 2016 as a comical maid Consuelo in Babilônia. As of 2017 she is cast on a major role in a new telenovela O Alienista, based on a book by Machado de Assis.

Filmography

Television

Footnotes

External links 

1942 births
Living people
Brazilian television actresses
Brazilian telenovela actresses
Brazilian film actresses
Brazilian stage actresses